NOF may refer to:

Medicine
 Neck of femur, a flattened pyramidal process of bone
 Non-ossifying Fibroma

Organisations
 National Fascist Community (Národní Obec Fašistická), a Czechoslovakian Fascist movement
 Norsk Ornitlogisk Forening, Norwegian name of the Norwegian Ornithological Society
 NOF (radio station), a 1920s U.S. Navy radio station in Anacostia, D.C.

Other
 NetObjects Fusion, a web design tool
 Nitrosyl fluoride
 Nomane language, by ISO 639 code
 No Ordinary Family, a one-hour sci-fi comedy-drama TV series on ABC

See also
 Noph (disambiguation)''.